In enzymology, a (−)-borneol dehydrogenase is an enzyme that catalyzes the chemical reaction

(−)-borneol + NAD  (−)-camphor + NADH + H

Thus, the two substrates of this enzyme are (−)-borneol and NAD, whereas its 3 products are (−)-camphor, NADH, and H.

This enzyme belongs to the family of oxidoreductases, specifically those acting on the CH-OH group of donor with NAD or NADP as acceptor. The systematic name of this enzyme class is (−)-borneol:NAD oxidoreductase.

References 

EC 1.1.1
NADH-dependent enzymes
Enzymes of unknown structure